Arjāsp is a Turanian king in Shahnameh, the national epic of Greater Iran. Iranica mentions him as a chief of an ancient Iranian tribe named Xyōns. He is son of Shavāsp, the brother of Afrasiab. However, the unknown author of Moǰmal al-tavārikh mentions him as a grandson of Afrasiab, and Bal'ami mentions him as Afrasiab's brother.

In Shahnameh, after Zoroaster presents his new religion to Kay Goshtasp, the latter accepts the religion as the official religion of Iran, but Arjāsp, the king of Turan, does not accept it and retain his ancient religion and then invade Iran. Goshtasp is unable to repel his attacks, but Goshtasp's son, Esfandiar, defeats him. Beside Shahnameh, Arjāsp is mentioned in other sources. In the Middle Persian text Yadegar-e Zariran, Arjāsp is captured, mutilated, and then released. In Bundahishn, it is said that Arjāsp was defeated in the mountain Mad-Frayād between Padešxwārgar and Kumish.

Several years later, Goshtasp imprisoned Esfandiar, accusing him to rebel and usurp the throne. He then left Balkh for Sistan. When Arjāsp learns about Goshtasp's absence and Esfandiar's imprisonment, he invades Iran. Arjāsp kills Lohrasp, Goshtasp's father, and takes his two daughters as captive and imprisons them in Dez-e Rooyin. Unable to defeat Arjāsp, Jamasp, Goshtasp's vizier, releases Esfandiar and the latter repels Arjāsp army from Iran, kills him and releases his sisters, Homai and Beh-Afarid.

Tabari, Bal'ami, and Ebn al-Balkhi mention his name as Kharzāsp, and Ebn Khordādbeh refers to him as Hazārasf. According to Iranica, the two latter forms are misreadings of the Pahlavi word.

References 

Shahnameh characters